The Oregon Equality Act is a law of the U.S. state of Oregon which prohibits discrimination based on sexual orientation and gender identity in employment, housing, public accommodations, and other categories. Enacted in 2007, it became effective in 2008.

The act passed during the 74th Oregon Legislative Assembly. Senate Bill 2 was introduced on March 5, 2007 in the Oregon Senate, where it was approved on March 21 in a 21–7 vote. The Oregon House of Representatives amended the bill and voted 35–25 to approve it on April 17. The Oregon Senate voted 19–7 on April 19 to approve the amended bill. Governor Ted Kulongoski signed it on May 9, 2007 along with the Oregon Family Fairness Act, and it took effect on January 1, 2008.

References

See also 
 Employment Non-Discrimination Act
 Oregon Family Fairness Act
 LGBT rights in Oregon

Oregon law
LGBT law in the United States
LGBT in Oregon
2007 in American law
2007 in LGBT history
2007 in Oregon